Counterplan is a 1932 Soviet  drama film directed by Sergei Yutkevich and Fridrikh Ermler. The film's title song, "The Song of the Counterplan", composed by Dmitri Shostakovich with lyrics by the poet Boris Kornilov, became world famous. Shostakovich's composition, with new lyrics by Jeanne Perret, would be used shortly after in the notable song of the French socialist movement, "Au-devant de la vie". The same theme can be found before in Igor Stravinsky’s Petrushka and Sergei Taneyev’s first symphony. 

Shostakovich was to use the piece again in his Poem of the Motherland (1947), another film entitled Mitchurin (1948) and his 1958 operetta Moscow, Cheremushki!. In 1942 the song was given English words by Harold J. Rome under the title "United Nations on the March" and in this guise it was featured as the choral finale to MGM's patriotic war-time musical Thousands Cheer (1943). That same year, Leopold Stokowski made an orchestral arrangement of the song and this was given the title "United Nations March".  

This film could be considered a Stalin propaganda film. The plot involves an effort to catch "wreckers" at work in a Soviet factory.

Cast
 Vladimir Gardin - Babchenko
 Mariya Blyumental - Tamarina		
 Tatyana Guretskaya - Katya
 Andrei Abrikosov - Pavel	
 Boris Tenin - Vasya
 Boris Poslavsky - Skvortsov
 M. Pototskaya	- Skvortsov's mother	
 Aleksei Alekseyev - Plant's director	
 Nikolai Kozlovsky - Lazarev	
 Vladimir Sladkopevtsev - Morgun		
 Yakov Gudkin - Chutochkin	
 Nikolai Michurin - worker
 Pyotr Alejnikov - worker	
 Stepan Krylov - worker	
 Nikolai Cherkasov	
 Zoya Fyodorova

References

External links

1932 films
Lenfilm films
Soviet black-and-white films
Films directed by Sergei Yutkevich
Films directed by Fridrikh Ermler
Films scored by Dmitri Shostakovich
Soviet drama films
1932 drama films
1930s Russian-language films